Tega Peter Odele (born 6 December 1995) is a Nigerian sprinter. He competed in the 200 metres at the 2015 World Championships in Beijing without qualifying for the semifinals. He was the 2015 African Games 200 m Bronze medallist.

He attended Noble Crest Nursery and Primary School, Ughelli and got his Senior School leaving Certificate at Federal Government College, Warri. Odele studied Business Administration at the University of Benin.

In 2012, he won the 200 m at the 18th Nigerian National Sports Festival. He was supposed to run at the 2014 World Junior Championships but did not start in his heat. He won the 200 m at the 2014 Nigerian Universities Games in Ile-Ife. He was also a member of the 4 x 100 and 4 x 400 winning teams.
Odele won the 200 m at the 2015 Nigerian Championships in a personal best time of 20.47 s. He qualified for the 2015 World Championships with this run and was later selected to represent his country in Beijing.
He placed 6th in his heat with a time of 20.49 s and did not progress to the semifinals.

He set a personal best of 20.45 s in his heat of the 200 m at the 2015 African Games. He later finished third in the final behind Divine Oduduru and Hua Wilfried Koffi.

Competition record

1Disqualified in the final

References

External links

 

1995 births
Living people
Nigerian male sprinters
World Athletics Championships athletes for Nigeria
Athletes (track and field) at the 2015 African Games
Place of birth missing (living people)
Athletes (track and field) at the 2016 Summer Olympics
Olympic athletes of Nigeria
African Games bronze medalists for Nigeria
African Games medalists in athletics (track and field)
Competitors at the 2015 Summer Universiade
Sportspeople from Delta State
21st-century Nigerian people